Honda has made a number of naturally-aspirated V12 engines designed for Formula One motor racing; starting with the 1.5-litre RA271E engine in , and ending with the 3.0-litre RA273E in . The RA121E would go down as the last V12 engine to win a Formula One World Championship.

Applications
Honda RA271
Honda RA272
Honda RA273
Honda RA300
Honda RA301
RC-F1 1.0X (RC100) / RC-F1 1.5X (RC101) (prototypes; never raced)
McLaren MP4/6
McLaren MP4/7A

Grand Prix engine results
1 World Constructors' Championships.
1 World Drivers' Championships.
15 race wins.
12 pole positions.
35 podium finishes

References

 
RA
Formula One engines
Gasoline engines by model
V12 engines